Irish, like all modern Celtic languages, is characterized by its initial consonant mutations. These mutations affect the initial consonant of a word under specific morphological and syntactic conditions. The mutations are an important tool in understanding the relationship between two words and can differentiate various meanings.

Irish, like Manx and colloquial Scottish Gaelic, uses two mutations on consonants: lenition and eclipsis (the alternative names, aspiration for lenition and nasalisation for eclipsis, are also used, but those terms are misleading).

Originally these mutations were phonologically governed external sandhi effects: lenition was caused by a consonant being between two vowels, and eclipsis when a nasal preceded an obstruent, including at the beginning of a word.

There are also two mutations, t-prothesis and h-prothesis, found on vowel-initial words.

See Irish phonology for a discussion of the symbols used on this page.

Summary table
This table shows the orthographical and phonological effects of both lenition and eclipses.

Environments of Lenition

After proclitics

After the definite article 
The definite article triggers lenition of:

 a feminine noun in the nominative singular
  "the woman"
 a masculine noun in the genitive singular
  "of the man" e.g. , the man's car (car of the man)
 a noun in the dative singular, when the article follows one of the prepositions  "from",  "to" or  "in"
  +  = :  "to the man"
  +  = :  "from the woman"
  +  = :  "in the tree";  "in the autumn"

  "the drink", although  is feminine nominative singular
  "of the house", although  is masculine genitive singular

 Where an  would be lenited after the article, it becomes  (rather than ), written ts:

   "the eye" (fem. nom. sg.)
   "of the world" (masc. gen. sg.)

After the vocative particle  

  "Bríd!"
  "Seán!"
  "my friends!"

After possessive pronouns 
The possessive pronouns that trigger lenition are  "my",  "your (sg.)",  "his"

  "my son"
  "your house"
  "his pen"

After certain prepositions 

  "out of a tree"
  "under a tree"
  "as a person"
  "from Cork"
  "before morning"
  "through frost and snow"
  "at Easter"
  "both men and women"
  "on a table"

After the preterite/conditional of the copula 

  "He was a big person."
  "That was nice of you."

After the preterite preverbal particles 

  "He was not a teacher."
  "I didn't give"
  "Was he a priest?"
  "Did he come?"

After certain preverbal particles 

  "I don't understand"
  "if he comes"
  "the man who will give it to me"

A verb in the preterite, imperfect or conditional 
These were originally preceded by the particle  and often still are in Munster.

  "I broke"
  "I used to break"
  "I would break"

In modifier + head constructions 
Lenition is blocked in these constructions if two coronals are adjacent.

After certain numbers 
The singular form is used after numbers and is lenited in the following cases:

  "one cow"
  "the first year"
  "two houses"
  "two men"
  "three boats"
  "four cows"
  "five pounds"
  "six months"

After preposed adjectives 
Constructions of adjective + noun are written as compounds.

  "old woman"
  "bad person"
  "good deed"
  "modern language"
  "stormy sea"
  "true skin"
  "high pressure"
  "young man"

After most prefixes 

  "very small"
  "too small"
  "retake"
  "new year"
  "undeniable"
  "saucer"
  "overalls"
  "interconfessional"
  "polygamy"
  "stepmother"
  "unhappy"
  "insomnia"
  "capital city"
  "fragile"

The second part of a compound 

  "noun" (lit. "name word")
  "dark blue"
  "national debt"

In head + modifier constructions 
In these constructions coronals are lenited even following other 

  "rainy weather" (lenition after a feminine singular noun)
  "bottles of juice" (lenition after a plural ending in a slender consonant)
  "Seán's house" (lenition of a definite noun in the genitive)

Postposed adjectives in certain circumstances 

  "a pretty woman" (lenition after a feminine singular noun)
  "the big men" (lenition after a plural noun ending in a slender consonant)
  "the name of the small man" (lenition after a masculine singular noun in the genitive)

Environments of Eclipsis

After plural possessive pronouns 
The possessive pronouns that trigger eclipsis are  "our",  "your (pl.)",  "their"

  "our friends"
  "your (pl.) children"
  "their boat",

Note that  can mean "his", "her" or "their", but these different uses can still be distinguished, since  causes lenition when used as "his", causes eclipsis when used as "their", and neither when used as "her".

After certain numbers 
The numbers that trigger eclipsis (the noun being in the singular) are:

  "seven horses"
  "eight donkeys"
  "nine cats"
  "ten pens"

After the preposition  "in" 

  "in a house"
  "in Ireland"

Genitive plural nouns after the definite article 
The genitive plural article  eclipses a following noun:

  "of the donkeys"
  "of the words"

Dative singular nouns after the definite article 

  "by the man"
  "on the tree"

After certain preverbal particles 

  "the hole that the rabbits come out of"
  "Does he come every day?"
  "Where are my glasses?"
  "He said that he would come."
  "if I had known that"

Changes to vowel-initial words
A vowel-initial word does not change if a lenition is expected:
 "the night" (feminine singular nominative noun after definite article)
 "of the water" (masculine singular genitive noun after definite article)
 "from Scotland" (noun after leniting preposition)
 "grandfather" (noun after preposed adjective:  "old" +  "father")

However, if neither eclipsis nor lenition is expected, an initial vowel may acquire a prothetic onset consonant. For example, a vowel-initial masculine singular nominative noun requires a t- (a voiceless coronal plosive) after the definite article:
 "the water" (masculine singular nominative)

Otherwise, there is the prothetic onset h (a voiceless glottal fricative), which comes only when both the following conditions are met:
a proclitic causes neither lenition nor eclipsis of consonants.
a proclitic itself ends in a vowel.

Examples of h-prothesis
 "to Ireland" (after preposition  "to, towards")
 "with Antaine" (after preposition  "with")
 "of the night" (on feminine singular genitive noun after definite article)
 "the birds" (on plural nominative/dative noun after definite article)
 "as high as a castle" (after chomh  "as")
 "beautifully" (after adverb-forming particle )
 "Don't leave me!" (after negative imperative particle  "don't")
 "the second place" (after an ordinal numeral)

References

Mutations
Morphophonology